Friedrich 'Fritz' Cejka (3 July 1928 – 26 November 2020) was an Austrian football forward who played for Austria. He also played for Admira Wien, Wiener AC, Kapfenberger SV and First Vienna FC.

References

External links
 
 

1928 births
2020 deaths
Austrian footballers
Austria international footballers
Association football forwards
Wiener AC players
FC Admira Wacker Mödling players
Kapfenberger SV players
First Vienna FC players
People from Korneuburg
Footballers from Lower Austria